Tougoudadou is a village in the Piéla Department of Gnagna Province in eastern Burkina Faso. The village has a population of 612.

References

Populated places in the Est Region (Burkina Faso)
Gnagna Province